Boahia is a town in eastern Ivory Coast. It is a sub-prefecture of Koun-Fao Department in Gontougo Region, Zanzan District.

Boahia was a commune until March 2012, when it became one of 1126 communes nationwide that were abolished.
In 2014, the population of the sub-prefecture of Boahia was 9,182.

Villages
The xx villages of the sub-prefecture of Boahia and their population in 2014 are:
 Abokosso (599)
 Boahia (3 968)
 Dabokitira (627)
 Daboyaokro (533)
 Doumorossi (1 097)
 Kodjinan (528)
 Morsankro (657)
 N'dakro (517)
 Yaobilékro (656)

Notes

Sub-prefectures of Gontougo
Former communes of Ivory Coast